Scott Swanson (born February 2, 1975) is an American ice hockey coach and former defenseman who was an All-American for Colorado College.

Career
Swanson played his junior hockey for the Omaha Lancers, helping the team win the Clark Cup in 1994. After producing more than a point per game in his final year and being named league MVP, Swanson was drafted by the Washington Capitals in the 9th round of the NHL Draft. He began attending Colorado College the following fall and joined a team that was on the ascent. In his freshman season Swanson continued to score in bunches, finishing third in the nation amongst defensemen. He helped CC reach the NCAA championship game, their first in almost 40 years, and was named to the All-Tournament Team.

Swanson took a step back the following year, seeing his point production more than halve, but was still part of a team that reached the Frozen Four. He recovered in his junior year and then posted new career highs as a senior. In his final season Swanson was named an All-American, leading the Tigers to their 6th-consecutive 20-win season and 5th-consecutive NCAA tournament appearance.

After graduating, Swanson signed professionally and spent his first year with the Houston Aeros. Swanson found him demoted to the ECHL in his second year and went on to help the South Carolina Stingrays win the 2001 Kelly Cup. He spent most of the next three years playing AA-hockey, making one final appearance at the AHL-level. After playing a single game for the Wilkes-Barre/Scranton Penguins, he finished out the year with the Colorado Eagles and then retired as a player.

In 2007, Swanson began volunteering as a coach for North Colorado Youth Hockey. five years later, he was hired on as a Director and continues to work in that capacity as of 2021.

Career statistics

Awards and honors

References

External links

1975 births
Living people
AHCA Division I men's ice hockey All-Americans
American men's ice hockey defensemen
Ice hockey people from Minnesota
People from Cottage Grove, Minnesota
Colorado College Tigers men's ice hockey players
Houston Aeros (1994–2013) players
South Carolina Stingrays players
Springfield Falcons players
Idaho Steelheads (WCHL) players
Colorado Eagles players
Wilkes-Barre/Scranton Penguins players
Washington Capitals draft picks